Teinoptera gafsana is a moth of the family Noctuidae first described by Charles Theodore Blachier in 1905. It is found from Morocco through all north-western Africa to Libya. It is also found in the central Arabian deserts, Iraq and Israel.

Adults are on wing from February to April. There is one generation per year.

References

Cuculliinae
Moths of the Middle East